Silvana Cucchietti (born 30 December 1957) is a former Italian female long-distance runner who competed at individual senior level at the IAAF World Women's Road Race Championships.

She won Rome Marathon in 1990, Turin Marathon in 1988, Ferrara Marathon in 1990 and 1991 and Roma-Ostia Half Marathon in 1987.

National titles
She won a national championships at individual senior level.
Italian Athletics Championships
Half marathon: 1990

References

External links
 

1957 births
Living people
Italian female long-distance runners
Italian female marathon runners
20th-century Italian women
21st-century Italian women